Would You Believe? was an Australian television game show that screened from 1970 to 1974. It was made by the Australian Broadcasting Corporation (ABC). The first episode screened on 9 February 1970. Episodes ran for 30 minutes and screened in black and white, on Sunday nights, at 7.30pm.

The host of the program was Peter Lazar. Two teams of three people took turns to tell stories about some person, event or place. The rotating group of panellists included Jacki Weaver, Cyril Pearl, Michael Baume, Noeline Brown, Len Evans and Frank Hardy.

It was described as, a “game of truth and/or lie about Australia’s early days and ways.” The show was enlivened by inventive and witty ad-libbing.

References

External links
 

1970s Australian game shows
Australian Broadcasting Corporation original programming
Black-and-white Australian television shows
English-language television shows
1970 Australian television series debuts
1974 Australian television series endings